Miss All-American Beauty is a 1982 American television film directed by Gus Trikonis and starring Diane Lane.

Plot summary

After winning a beauty contest in Texas, a teen-aged girl is unprepared for the demands of travel, press conferences and interviews that go with winning the title and participating in a national beauty pageant.

Cast
Diane Lane as Sally Butterfield
Cloris Leachman as Agatha Blaine
David Dukes as Avery McPherson
Jayne Meadows as Gertrude Hunnicutt
Alice Hirson as Marjorie Butterfield
Brian Kerwin as Michael Carrington
Norman Bennett as George Butterfield
Jim Mills as Buzz Butterfield
Bobby Fite as Petey Butterfield
Jane Roberts as Dottie Blaine

External links

1982 films
1982 drama films
Films about beauty pageants
Films set in Texas
American drama television films
Films directed by Gus Trikonis
1980s English-language films
1980s American films